The Florida Maritime Museum is a museum, sponsored by Manatee County Clerk of Circuit Courts, located on  of land within the historic fishing village of Cortez, Florida.

The museum tells a number of stories pertaining to all aspects of Florida’s maritime history. Exhibits include historic photographs, boat models, tools, instruments, and other historic artifacts. The museum also features a large collection of shells from the Gulf of Mexico. The museum is also home to a folk school that teaches traditional Florida skills and a research library with a variety of books, plans, logs, diaries, periodicals, letters, records and related archival material whose content is relevant to research concerning maritime subjects, with special emphases on Florida’s Gulf Coast.

The museum is housed in a 1912 schoolhouse building at the  Cortez Nature Preserve at 4415 119th Street West. Other historic structures located on the site include the 1890 Burton Store, a wood cistern, and the Pillsbury Boat Shop.

Mission 
The Florida Maritime Museum's mission is to collect, preserve and share traditional knowledge, cultural artifacts and personal stories specific to Florida’s fishing and maritime heritage.

Historic Structures and Grounds 
The Florida Maritime Museum is located on 4 acres of land that include native plant gardens, fountains, historic structures, and maritime objects. The grounds are open to the public from dusk to dawn.

1912 Cortez Rural Graded Schoolhouse 
The Cortez Rural Graded Schoolhouse was constructed in 1912 as one of six schools built by Manatee County that year. It replaced an older one room structure that still stands in the village. Originally three classrooms, in 1933, under a Federal Works Progress Administration program, the middle classroom was extended into an auditorium with stage forming a T-shaped floor plan. It was used as a school until 1961, when it was leased to an art school. It was ultimately sold to Robert Sailors, a master weaver, who made the building his home and studio. In 1999, Manatee County purchased the property and carefully restored the building. In 2006, it was reopened as the Florida Maritime Museum. The Cortez Schoolhouse is listed on the National Register of Historic Places as part of the Cortez Historic District.

Robert Sailor's Secret Garden and Butterfly Garden 
In 1974, Robert Sailors, a master weaver, purchased the Cortez Schoolhouse and transformed the property into his studio and living quarters. Sailors added two patios to the exterior of the schoolhouse, with one featuring a water sculpture of blue ceramic tile and lead-glass windows. Today, the Florida Maritime museum continues to maintain the water sculpture as well as other sculptures featured throughout the grounds.

1890 Burton/Bratton Store 

In the 1890s, William C. Bratton built the first commercial building at Hunter's Point, the original name of the area eventually to be called Cortez. The building served as post office, general store and steamboat wharf and connected the village's fishing families with the outside world. In 1900, rooms were added creating an inn which became known at the Albion Inn. Expanded over time, the Albion Inn along with the 1912 Cortez Schoolhouse served as refuge for the displaced residents of the small village during the destructive 1921 hurricane. In 1974, the inn closed and the property was sold to the US Coast Guard. Community effort spearheaded by the Cortez Village Historical Society and the Florida Institute of Saltwater Heritage (F.I.S.H.) saved the store from demolition in 1991. It was moved to this site in 2006. After renovations, the store was reopened as a part of the Florida Maritime Museum in 2018.

Pillsbury Boat Shop 
Edward Ithamar Pillsbury (1844-1930) started the Snead Island Boat Works on Snead Island in 1907. The Pillsbury Boat Shop was the first building constructed at the Snead Island Boat Works and named in honor of his son, Asa Harmon Pillsbury (1900-1985). As the boat works grew to accommodate the demand for larger boats, additional buildings were added to the complex and the original building was modified for use as a machine shop, housing a lathe, small milling machine, and other metal working tools. Eventually the property was sold in 1930s and the Pillsburys moved the structure to their home three miles away. It served as a machine shop there, too, and was used to repair the Pillsbury dredging company's equipment. In 2007, the historic boat shop was transported, with sheriff escort, from Palmetto to the Florida Maritime Museum in Cortez.

Anchor of the Steamship 'Mistletoe' 
The Florida Maritime Museum's grounds feature the anchor of the steamship the 'Mistletoe.' The steamship, owned by Tampa fisherman John Savarese, regularly brought passengers and goods to from Tampa to Sarasota. The steamship stopped throughout Manatee County, including Bradenton and Cortez, until sinking in a hurricane in 1910. Shortly after she sank, the steamship was raised, renovated, and rechristened 'The City of Sarasota' in 1911. She continued to carry passengers and cargo from Tampa to Sarasota until 1917. Pillsbury Boat Works on Snead Island purchased the steamship and converted her into a barge for a short time before pulling her ashore and burning her.

Marine Railway Winch 
The railway winch located on the Florida Maritime Museum's grounds was used to haul large boats out of the water and into a repair station or dry-dock. The winch has a carriage pivotally connected to a support frame near the front of the carriage, and on a traverse horizontal axis. The rear of the support frame is provided with support abutments that are adjustable to accommodate the contour of the boat. A cable loop extends from a submerged pulley at the other end of the railway, and engages a winch activated by a remote control unit. The carriage is interposed in one side of the loop. This winch was used in the local area until the late 1980s. This unit’s last location was the Rivertown Boatworks located on the Manatee River in Bradenton.

Collections

The Blake Banks Collection 
Captain Blake Banks was a successful Cortez fisherman with a passion for sea life. His collection is well documented, making it especially important academically. All of his specimens were collected in the Gulf of Mexico, some of which were eventually donated to the Florida Maritime Museum by his widow, Betty. Researchers and volunteers at the museum have been working studiously to create a chart that serves as a snapshot of where these specimens were collected.

Ship Models 
Many of the models on display at the Florida Maritime Museum are miniature versions of real ships that played a role in Florida’s maritime history.

Maritime Library 
The Florida Maritime Museum is home to a small library of books on maritime topics that range from tales of old Florida to boat building and design. In addition to books, the museum houses a collection of boat plans, nautical charts and other archival materials that are available for scholarly research.

The Folk School at the Florida Maritime Museum 
The Folk School, which began in January 2017, enables Florida Maritime Museum to take their mission a step further with hands-on classes formulated to not only learn and preserve classic skills, but to share stories, build community and grow appreciation for the history of Cortez and the greater surrounding area.

See also
List of museums in Florida

References

External links
Florida Maritime Museum website
Florida Maritime Museum Research Library
Historic American Engineering Record (HAER) documentation, filed under Florida Maritime Museum, 4415 119th Street West, Cortez, Manatee County, FL:

Museums in Manatee County, Florida
Maritime museums in Florida
Shell museums
Historic American Engineering Record in Florida